Vasile Oprea (born 3 March 1957) is a retired Romanian handball player who won a bronze medal at the 1984 Summer Olympics. After retiring from competitions he became a coach, first in Romania, and since 1996 in Germany.

References

1957 births
Living people
Romanian male handball players
Sportspeople from Bucharest
CS Dinamo București (men's handball) players
Handball players at the 1984 Summer Olympics
Olympic handball players of Romania
Olympic bronze medalists for Romania
Olympic medalists in handball
Medalists at the 1984 Summer Olympics